Pimelea milliganii, commonly known as silver riceflower or Milligan's rice flower, is a species of flowering plant in the family Thymelaeaceae and is endemic to a restricted part of Tasmania. It is a low, much-branched, densely hairy shrub with more or less elliptic leaves and compact clusters of white to pinkish flowers usually surrounded by two leaf-like involucral bracts.

Description
Flowering has been observed between December and March.

Taxonomy
Pimelea milliganii was first formally described in 1857 by Carl Meissner in 1845 in de Candolle's Prodromus Systematis Naturalis Regni Vegetabilis from specimens collected by Joseph Milligan near Macquarie Harbour.

Distribution

Conservation status
Pimelea milliganii is listed as "rare" under the Tasmanian Government Threatened Species Protection Act 1995.

References

milliganii
Malvales of Australia
Taxa named by Carl Meissner
Plants described in 1857
Flora of Tasmania